Siti is a 2014 Indonesian drama film directed by Eddie Cahyono. The film first aired in 2014 at the Jogja-NETPAC Asian Film Festival, and was later widely distributed in 2016. The film won three awards at the Indonesian Film Festival in 2015.

Accolades

References 

2010s Indonesian-language films
2014 films
2014 drama films
Indonesian drama films